The 2016 Copa Libertadores second stage was played from 16 February to 21 April 2016. A total of 32 teams competed in the second stage to decide the 16 places in the final stages of the 2016 Copa Libertadores.

Draw
The draw of the tournament was held on 22 December 2015, 20:30 PYST (UTC−3), at the CONMEBOL Convention Centre in Luque, Paraguay.

Starting from this season, teams were seeded by the newly established CONMEBOL ranking of the Copa Libertadores (except for teams from Mexico which were not ranked and thus seeded last in all draws), taking into account of the following three factors:
Performance in the last 10 years, taking into account Copa Libertadores results in the period 2006–2015
Historical coefficient, taking into account Copa Libertadores results in the period 1960–2005
Local tournament champion, with bonus points awarded to domestic league champions of the last 10 years

For the second stage, the 32 teams were drawn into eight groups of four containing a team from each of the four pots. The defending champions (River Plate) were automatically placed first in Pot 1 and allocated to Group 1 for the draw. The remaining teams were seeded based on their CONMEBOL ranking (shown in parentheses). Teams from the same association in Pots 1, 2 and 3 could not be drawn into the same group. Teams from Mexico were allocated to Pot 4, together with the winners of the first stage, whose identity was not known at the time of the draw, and they could be drawn into the same group with another team from the same association.

The six winners of the first stage which joined the 26 direct entrants were as follows:
Winner G1:  Santa Fe
Winner G2:  Huracán
Winner G3:  Racing
Winner G4:  River Plate
Winner G5:  Independiente del Valle
Winner G6:  São Paulo

Format

In the second stage, each group was played on a home-and-away round-robin basis. The teams were ranked according to points (3 points for a win, 1 point for a draw, and 0 points for a loss). If tied on points, the following criteria would be used to determine the ranking: 1. Goal difference; 2. Goals scored; 3. Away goals scored; 4. Drawing of lots (Regulations Article 5.1). The winners and runners-up of each group advanced to the round of 16.

Groups
The fixture list was determined by the draw as follows:
Round 1: Team 3 vs. Team 1, Team 4 vs. Team 2
Round 2: Team 1 vs. Team 4, Team 2 vs. Team 3
Round 3: Team 2 vs. Team 1, Team 3 vs. Team 4
Round 4: Team 1 vs. Team 2, Team 4 vs. Team 3
Round 5: Team 4 vs. Team 1, Team 3 vs. Team 2
Round 6: Team 1 vs. Team 3, Team 2 vs. Team 4

The matches were played on 16–18, 23–25 February, 1–3, 8–10, 15–17 March, 5–7, 12–14 and 19–21 April 2016.

Group 1

Group 2

Group 3

Group 4

Group 5

Group 6

Group 7

Group 8

References

External links
 
Copa Libertadores 2016, CONMEBOL.com 

2